Math-U-See, developed by Steve Demme is a K–12 homeschool mathematics curriculum, emphasizing mastery of materials and encouraging instructors to let students learn at their own pace. Because of the tutor style model, Math-U-See is being adopted by special education departments Response to intervention programs. Math-U-See curricula includes Primer, Alpha, Beta, Gamma, Delta, & Epsilon as well as other books.

Notes

External links 
  Math-U-See website

Mathematics education reform
Homeschooling